Tanka (Aymara for tanka hat or biretta, Quechua for fork, Hispanicized spelling Tanca) is a  mountain in the Andes of Peru. It is situated in the Arequipa Region, Condesuyos Province, Cayarani District, in the southern extensions of the Wansu mountain range. Tanka lies at the Puma Ranra (or Sunqu P'allqa) valley, south of Allqa Q'awa.

References 

Mountains of Peru
Mountains of Arequipa Region